Hinkleville may refer to:

Hinkleville, Kentucky, an unincorporated community in Ballard County
Hinkleville, West Virginia, an unincorporated community in Upshur County